Gëzim Ostreni (born 1 November 1942) is a former KLA and NLA general. Ostreni is known for participating in the Kosovo War and the 2001 insurgency in the Republic of Macedonia.

Life
General Gëzim Ostreni was born in the city of Debar on 1 November 1942. After finishing primary school, he also finished the school of reserve officers as well as some Military courses at the Military Academy. He graduated from the Faculty of Philosophy and Sociology in Prishtina. In the military field, he served as the commander of the territorial defense in Diber. He participated in the Kosovo War and gradually started upping up the ranks. In 2000, he was promoted to Major General. In the spring of 2001 he joined the NLA, where he united guerrilla groups from Kosovo and North Macedonia. With the start of the armed conflict in Macedonia he was assumed the role of Chief of the General Staff of the National Liberation Army which was created by Albanians in North Macedonia. On October 3, 2002, he became the deputy of Assembly of Macedonia. In 2004, he became a candidate for the President of the Macedonian state and from 2002 to 2006 vice president of the Macedonian Assembly.

References

1942 births
Living people